Blue Island is a 2022 Hong Kong documentary film directed by Chan Tze-woon. It focuses on the 2019–2020 Hong Kong protests. The film won the Best International Feature Documentary Award at the 2022 Hot Docs Festival.

Reception
The film received positive reviews in Variety and The New York Times.

Simon Abrams of RogerEbert.com rated the film 2.5 stars out of 5, writing that it "features a lot of great footage, but a lot of it either doesn’t hang together or flow seamlessly from one episodic scene to the next."

References

External links

 
 

Hong Kong documentary films
2022 documentary films